Golcowa  is a village in the administrative district of Gmina Domaradz, within Brzozów County, Subcarpathian Voivodeship, in south-eastern Poland.

The village has a population of 2,200.
In the village are two schools and two churches, larch in this historic parish church. St. Barbara was built probably in 1485. This monument is located on the Wooden Architecture list.

The village is covered with hills. There were oil deposits. There are hills reaching 478 meters above sea level. Beautiful views, forests, hills, unspoilt natural environment, scenic river Golcówka, these are the natural qualities of the village.

References

 website - Golcowa (in Polish)

Golcowa